Evan King and Max Schnur were the defending champions but chose not to defend their title.

Diego Hidalgo and Cristian Rodríguez won the title after defeating Pedro Cachín and Facundo Mena 6–4, 6–4 in the final.

Seeds

Draw

References

External links
 Main draw

Challenger de Santiago - Doubles
2022 Doubles